"Down Boy" is a song written by Rob Davis and produced by Nellee Hooper for Australian actress Holly Valance's debut album, Footprints (2002). Released on 30 September 2002 as the second single from the album, "Down Boy" charted within the top 10 in the United Kingdom ( 2), Australia (No. 3), Hungary (No. 8), and Ireland (No. 8). British television presenter and actress Alexa Chung plays Valance's friend in the music video.

Track listings

Australian and UK CD1
 "Down Boy" (radio edit) – 3:25
 "Down Boy" (Twin club remix) – 6:07
 "Down Boy" (Almighty mix) – 6:48
 "Down Boy" (video)

Australian CD2
 "Down Boy" (radio edit) – 3:25
 "Down Boy" (Aphrodite remix) – 6:25
 "Down Boy" (Blackout remix) – 4:26
 "Down Boy" (Jah Wobble remix) – 5:15

UK CD2
 "Down Boy" (radio edit) – 3:25
 "Down Boy" (Aphrodite remix) – 6:25
 "Down Boy" (Jah Wobble remix) – 5:15

UK cassette single and European CD single
 "Down Boy" (radio edit) – 3:25
 "Down Boy" (Twin club remix) – 6:07

Charts

Weekly charts

Year-end charts

Certifications

References

2002 singles
Holly Valance songs
Music videos directed by Tim Royes
Song recordings produced by Nellee Hooper
Songs written by Rob Davis (musician)